Mark Studaway (born September 20, 1960) is a former American football defensive end. He played for the Houston Oilers in 1984, the Tampa Bay Buccaneers in 1985 and for the Atlanta Falcons in 1987.

References

1960 births
Living people
American football defensive ends
Tennessee Volunteers football players
Houston Oilers players
Tampa Bay Buccaneers players
Atlanta Falcons players
National Football League replacement players